Butler Leon White (March 21, 1892 – September 2, 1954) was an American Negro league first baseman in the 1920s.

A native of Clinton, Kentucky, White played for the Chicago Giants in 1920. In 35 recorded games, he posted 34 hits and 19 RBI in 140 plate appearances. White died in Chicago, Illinois in 1954 at age 62.

References

External links
 and Seamheads

1892 births
1954 deaths
Chicago Giants players
Baseball first basemen
Baseball players from Kentucky
People from Hickman County, Kentucky
20th-century African-American sportspeople